The 2010–11 season was Colchester United's 69th season in their history and third successive season in the third tier of English football, League One. Alongside competing in the League One, the club also participated in the FA Cup, the League Cup and the Football League Trophy.

Aidy Boothroyd departed the club for Championship club Coventry City over the summer and his assistant John Ward was promoted to first-team manager. Owner and chairman Robbie Cowling scaled back on the spending of the previous three seasons, restricting Ward's transfer budget. Ward led the team to a credible tenth position league finish, nine points away from the play-offs while reaching the third round of the FA Cup. They were eliminated by Swansea City, while Premier League Sunderland won 2–0 in the second round of the League Cup. Old rivals Wycombe Wanderers beat the U's in the second round of the Football League Trophy.

Season overview
After less than ten months in charge, Aidy Boothroyd left the club to join Championship side Coventry City. His assistant, John Ward, was promoted to first-team manager. Robbie Cowling announced that a more prudent long-term approach would be required by the club to survive, and so restricted his financial input after three seasons of spending large figures on transfer fees.

Key players from last season left the club over the summer including David Fox, Kevin Lisbie, Clive Platt and David Prutton, while Danny Batth and Kevin Lisbie returned to their parent clubs on the expiry of their loan deals. John Ward made several free transfers to replace them, including free agents Lloyd James and Brian Wilson, non-League players Andy Bond and Ben Coker, while Dave Mooney was signed on a season-long loan from Reading.

August
In the opening game of the season, Colchester quickly went behind 1–0, but found themselves leading by the eleventh minute following an Anthony Wordsworth brace. A late equaliser denied Ward victory in his first game in charge. On 10 August, Dave Mooney registered his first two goals for the club in a 3–0 win at Hereford United in the League Cup. These were to be his only away goals until the penultimate game of the season.

On 14 August Andy Bond scored his first goal for the club since joining from Barrow against Sheffield Wednesday. The U's were again denied victory by a late equaliser. Ward's first win then followed a week later with a late goal going for them on this occasion. Bond had given the U's the lead at Rochdale, and following an equaliser from the hosts, Ian Henderson grabbed an 84th-minute winner.

On 24 August, in the League Cup second round, Premier League Sunderland hosted Colchester at the Stadium of Light. Two first-half errors from Mark Cousins handed Sunderland victory, with Darren Bent capitalising on both occasions.

For a third time this month, Colchester were again denied victory by a late equaliser during their home game against Carlisle United on 27 August. Carlisle scored a 93rd minute equaliser, cancelling out Dave Mooney's opener.

September
Colchester started September with a 1–0 win at Walsall thanks to an Andy Bond goal. He then recorded his fourth goal in five games in a 1–1 home draw with Plymouth Argyle a week later.

On 18 September, Cousins made up for his mistakes at Sunderland to record a solid point against Southampton, making numerous vital saves. This was followed up with a 3–1 home win over Tranmere Rovers, with Mooney, Wordsworth and Magnus Okuonghae's goals all coming within the first 31-minutes of play.

On 28 September, Colchester had to settle for a point in an Essex derby game against Dagenham & Redbridge. Having come from behind to lead 2–1 through Ashley Vincent and Dave Mooney goals, the lead was surrendered in the 72nd-minute.

October
On 2 October, the U's recorded another score draw at Milton Keynes Dons, when a dominant first half performance and a goal from Okuonghae was again cancelled out by an opposition equaliser. The U's to this point had made a 10-game unbeaten start to the campaign, while twelve points had been lost from winning positions.

With Ben Williams making a return to the first-team following injury, back-to-back home defeats followed. First, the U's lost 2–0 to rivals Wycombe Wanderers in the Football League Trophy, before being thrashed 3–0 by Huddersfield Town.

Colchester recorded a point at the Colchester Community Stadium against Oldham Athletic before two wins rounded out October. First, a 2–1 win over Notts County, coming from behind to win following a brace of Kayode Odejayi goals, and then a 2–1 win at Dean Court against Bournemouth, Tom Williams and Ian Henderson the scorers.

November
November saw Colchester win two five-goal thrillers in the league and a seven-goal thriller in the FA Cup. First, they came from 2–0 down at home after 18-minutes to Leyton Orient to win 3–2, courtesy of Matt Heath, Dave Mooney and Brian Wilson goals. Then, they edged League Two Bradford City 4–3 in the FA Cup in an evenly contested game, Bond and Wilson the scorers with two from Dave Mooney. They lost 2–1 at Swindon Town on 13 November before registering a 3–2 win over Hartlepool United. Ian Henderson scored a 92nd-minute penalty to win the match after earlier Bond and Odejayi goals.

November ended with a 2–0 home defeat by Brentford, before scraping a 1–0 win over non-League side Swindon Supermarine 1–0 in the second round of the FA Cup on 27 November.

December
Poor weather conditions meant that the U's only played once in the whole of December, a 0–0 draw with Yeovil Town.

January
With Marc Tierney and Paul Reid sold to Championship clubs Norwich City and Scunthorpe United respectively in the transfer window, and Brian Wilson ruled out for eight-weeks through injury, the U's began 2011 with a completely different back four to the one which started the season.

Colchester drew 3–3 with Charlton Athletic on New Year's Day, with both sides having a man sent off. Heath, Bond and Wordsworth were the U's scorers. They then conceded four goals in each of their next two games, suffering a 4–2 defeat to Leyton Orient, and then losing 4–0 at Swansea City in the third round of the FA Cup.

Striker Steven Gillespie made a return from injury and came off the bench to score both of Colchester's goals in their home win against Bournemouth on 14 January.

On 22 January, Colchester held Huddersfield to a 0–0 draw, before suffering a 2–0 defeat at Brighton & Hove Albion. They saw out January by recording a 2–1 win over Peterborough United having conceded in the first minute of play.

February
Pat Baldwin was ruled out with an ankle injury for the remainder of the season, prompting Ward to sign Huddersfield's Nathan Clarke on loan, while Mark Cousins replaced Williams in goal following another injury.

Colchester lost 1–0 on 1 February at Charlton after having a genuine goal disallowed. They then lost 1–0 at Hartlepool before returning to winning ways at home to Swindon on 12 February. Colchester's patchy form continued with a 2–0 defeat at Notts County on 15 February, and then registered a 2–0 win against Walsall four days later.

The U's away form was dipping, aside from a 1–1 draw at Peterborough on 22 February. They were then defeated on the road to ten-man Plymouth by 2–1. Only Colchester's home form kept them in touching distance of the play-off places.

March
Kayode Odejayi became the first Colchester striker to score an away goal in just over one year when they recorded a 1–0 win at Bristol Rovers on 1 March. However, four straight defeats all by ruled out Colchester's chances at reaching the play-offs.

First, they were beaten 2–0 by Southampton at home, followed by a 1–0 defeat at Dagenham & Redbridge. A Sam Baldock hat-trick gave MK Dons a 3–1 win at the Community Stadium, before Tranmere Rovers won 1–0 at Prenton Park. This result left Colchester closer to the relegation zone than the play-offs.

Two home victories ensured the U's moved away from the relegation places, with a 1–0 win over Oldham, before registering their best result of the season, a 5–1 win against nine-man Exeter on 26 March.

April
Colchester suffered defeat in Sheffield when they lost 2–1 to Wednesday at Hillsborough, but did earn a 1–0 home victory over Rochdale on 9 April. The long trip to Carlisle brought about a 4–1 defeat for the U's, before registering an away point at Brentford.

On 25 April, Colchester earned a point against champions-elect Brighton, but rounded off April with a 4–2 defeat at Yeovil.

May
In their final game of the season, Colchester faced already-relegated Bristol Rovers and won 2–1 thanks to two an Ian Henderson brace.

Players

Transfers

In

 Total spending:  ~ £0

Out

 Total incoming:  ~ £0

Loans in

Loans out

Match details

League One

League table

Results round by round

Matches

Football League Cup

Football League Trophy

FA Cup

Squad statistics

Appearances and goals

|-
!colspan="16"|Players who appeared for Colchester who left during the season

|}

Goalscorers

Disciplinary record

Captains
Number of games played as team captain.

Clean sheets
Number of games goalkeepers kept a clean sheet.

Player debuts
Players making their first-team Colchester United debut in a fully competitive match.

See also
List of Colchester United F.C. seasons

References

General

Specific

2010-11
2010–11 Football League One by team